Convoluted tubule is the compound of a metanephridium which is wrapped with capillaries. It is highly coiled so as to increase surface area for more effective reabsorption, which occurs in this part of the metanephridium.

References

Annelid anatomy